Molla Mallory defeated Marion Zinderstein 6–3, 6–1 in the final to win the women's singles tennis title at the 1920 U.S. National Championships. The event was played on outdoor grass courts and held at the Philadelphia Cricket Club in Chestnut Hill, Philadelphia from September 20 through September 25, 1920. It was Mallory's fifth U.S. National singles title.

Draw

Final eight

References

1920
1920 in women's tennis
1920 in American women's sports
Women's Singles
Chestnut Hill, Philadelphia
1920s in Philadelphia
1920 in sports in Pennsylvania
Women's sports in Pennsylvania